Wyman-Gordon Grafton Plant, formerly known as Air Force Plant 63, is a plant of Wyman-Gordon located in North Grafton, Massachusetts. It was purchased by Wyman-Gordon in 1982 from the United States Air Force, although the company had been operating as a contractor for the plant since its establishment. The plant is also home to the one of two of the nation's largest forging presses.

References

Plants of the United States Air Force
Grafton, Massachusetts
Wyman-Gordon